Studley High School is a mixed secondary school located in Studley in the English county of Warwickshire.

Previously a foundation school administered by Warwickshire County Council, Studley High School converted to academy status in June 2011. However the school continues to coordinate with Warwickshire County Council for admissions. The school offers GCSEs as programmes of study for pupils.

References

External links
Studley High School official website

Secondary schools in Warwickshire
Academies in Warwickshire